The 2000 BYU Cougars football team represented Brigham Young University during the 2000 NCAA Division I-A football season. It was LaVell Edwards' final season as head coach of the program he had helped elevate to national prominence.

Schedule

•SportsWest Productions (SWP) games were shown locally on KSL 5. BYU Sports Network carried all home games on a tape delayed basis with commentary provided by Brett Richins and Chris Twitty.

Game summaries

Florida State

Virginia

Air Force

Mississippi State

UNLV

Syracuse

Utah State

San Diego State

Wyoming

Colorado State

New Mexico

Utah

Roster

References

BYU
BYU Cougars football seasons
BYU Cougars football